Corazón de dos ciudades, (English: Heart of Two Cities) is a Mexican telenovela produced by Televisa and originally transmitted by Telesistema Mexicano.

Cast 
Herbert Wallace
Julián Bravo
Enrique Ramsey
Guillermo Orea

References

External links 

Mexican telenovelas
Televisa telenovelas
Spanish-language telenovelas
1969 telenovelas
1969 Mexican television series debuts
1969 Mexican television series endings